Karolina Kucharczyk (born 24 April 1991 in Rawicz) is a Polish Paralympic athlete who began in her sport at age twelve. She won a gold medal for Poland at the 2012 Summer Paralympics in the Long Jump class F20. She broke her own record in doing so with a jump of 6.00m. She won a silver medal at the 2016 Summer Paralympics. She won a gold medal at the 2020 Summer Paralympics, in Women's long jump T20.

Career 

She competed at the 2011 World Championships, 2013 World Championships, 2015 World Championships, winning a gold medal, and 2019 World Championships.

References 

Paralympic athletes of Poland
Polish female long jumpers
Athletes (track and field) at the 2012 Summer Paralympics
Paralympic gold medalists for Poland
People from Rawicz
1991 births
Living people
World record holders in Paralympic athletics
Sportspeople from Greater Poland Voivodeship
Medalists at the 2012 Summer Paralympics
Medalists at the 2016 Summer Paralympics
Paralympic medalists in athletics (track and field)
Athletes (track and field) at the 2020 Summer Paralympics